Lasiospora is a genus of plants in the family Asteraceae, native to the Mediterranean region.

 Species
 Lasiospora eriolaena P.Candargy - Lesbos
 Lasiospora hirsuta (Gouan) Cass. - France, Italy, Spain, Croatia

References

Asteraceae genera
Cichorieae